The Coverdale Bible, compiled by Myles Coverdale and published in 1535, was the first complete Modern English translation of the Bible (not just the Old Testament or New Testament), and the first complete printed translation into English (cf. Wycliffe's Bible in manuscript). The later editions (folio and quarto) published in 1537 were the first complete Bibles printed in England. The 1537 folio edition carried the royal licence and was therefore the first officially approved Bible translation in English. The Psalter from the Coverdale Bible was included in the Great Bible of 1540 and the Anglican Book of Common Prayer beginning in 1662, and in all editions of the U.S. Episcopal Church Book of Common Prayer until 1979.

History

The place of publication of the 1535 edition was long disputed. The printer was assumed to be either Froschover in Zürich or Cervicornus and Soter (in Cologne or Marburg). Since the discovery of Guido Latré, in 1997, the printer has been identified as Merten de Keyser, in Antwerp. The publication was partly financed by Jacobus van Meteren, in Antwerp, whose sister-in-law, Adriana de Weyden, married John Rogers. The other backer of the Coverdale Bible was Jacobus van Meteren’s nephew, Leonard Ortels (†1539), the father of Abraham Ortelius (1527–1598),  humanist geographer and cartographer.

Although Coverdale was also involved in the preparation of the Great Bible of 1539, the Coverdale Bible continued to be reprinted. The last of over 20 editions of the whole Bible, or its New Testament, appeared in 1553.

Translation

Coverdale based his New Testament on Tyndale's translation. For the Old Testament, Coverdale used Tyndale's published Pentateuch and possibly his published Jonah. He apparently did not make use of any of Tyndale's other, unpublished, Old Testament material (cf. Matthew Bible). Instead, Coverdale himself translated the remaining books of the Old Testament and the Apocrypha. Coverdale used his working intermediate knowledge of Hebrew, Aramaic, and Greek; not being a Hebrew or Greek scholar, he worked primarily from German Bibles—Luther's Bible and the Swiss-German version (Zürich Bible) of Huldrych Zwingli and Leo Jud—and Latin sources including the Vulgate.

See also
Tyndale Bible
Matthew Bible
Taverner's Bible
Great Bible
Golden Legend 
William Caxton

Notes

References
 A. S. Herbert, Historical Catalogue of Printed Editions of the English Bible 1525–1961, London: British and Foreign Bible Society; New York: American Bible Society, 1968. SBN 564 00130 9.
 H. WAUWERMANS, art. Abraham Ortelius, col. 293.

External links
 Coverdale Bible online
 Online version of Sir Frederic G. Kenyon’s article in Hastings' Dictionary of the Bible, 1909]
 
 

1535 books
Early printed Bibles
History of Christianity in the United Kingdom
History of the Church of England
Tudor England
16th-century Christian texts
Bible translations into English
16th-century books
Anglican liturgical books